Duane Willard Beeson (July 16, 1921 – February 13, 1947) was an American fighter pilot and flying ace of World War II. He scored 22.08 victories, including 17.3 air-to-air kills, 12 of which were scored in the P-47C/D Thunderbolt, and 5.3 of which were scored in the P-51-B Mustang. Beeson was one of ten United States Army Air Forces pilots who became an ace in two different types of fighter aircraft.

Early life and education
Beeson was born on July 16, 1921 in Boise, Idaho. At Boise High School he joined the Junior Reserve Officers' Training Corps program as platoon bugler. Although slight in stature in high school, he was a member of a boxing club and played high school football.

By the spring of 1939 Beeson planned to study law at the University of California.

Military career
Beeson planned to join the Army Air Corps as a pilot, but as he had not completed the required two years of college he joined the Royal Canadian Air Force in Canada, which had no such entry qualifications.

Beeson joined the Royal Canadian Air Force on June 23, 1941 in Vancouver and trained at Prince Albert and Yorkton, Saskatchewan. By February 26, 1942, Beeson had 201 hours of flight time and had successfully completed the training curriculum with a rating of "A good average pilot and is slightly overconfident. No outstanding faults." Beeson was posted to Bournemouth, England and started conversion to the Hawker Hurricane. On September 5, 1942 Beeson was posted to No. 71 Squadron at Debden, Essex.

World War II
At the time the United States Army Air Forces were arriving in England for operations over Europe. The RAF Eagle Squadrons were being absorbed into the Eighth Air Force, and Beeson among those who resigned their RCAF commissions and transferred to the USAAF. The newly formed 4th Fighter Group continued to fly its RAF-issued Supermarine Spitfires until it received the P-47 Thunderbolts in early 1943.

Beeson flew his first combat mission with his new unit, the 334th Fighter Squadron. In November, Beeson flew a test flight to fire his guns and flew unauthorized over the French coast, attacking German road transport and damaging his aircraft.

In January 1943, Beeson was training on the Republic P-47 Thunderbolt. On May 8, 1943, Beeson engaged a group of German fighters and shot down a Bf 109. On June 26, during an escort mission over Dieppe he spotted two Messerschmitt 109s, one with a P-47 on his tail. Beeson shot down one Bf 109 into the sea, using just 400 rounds of ammunition. A month later Beeson was awarded the Distinguished Flying Cross in recognition of 37 combat missions and two victories.

On July 2, the 4th Fighter Group became the first fighter group to penetrate German airspace. Over the Netherlands, the group engaged a flight of Bf 109s, attacking a formation of B-17s. Beeson and his wingman dove from 21,000 feet into the enemy formation and Beeson shot down another Bf 109. In September, after 65 combat missions, he was awarded the Silver Star. On October 8, 1943 Beeson shot down two more Bf 109s over the Netherlands. The commanding officer, Lieutenant Colonel Donald Blakeslee, appointed Beeson the group's gunnery officer.

On January 29, 1944, Beeson shot down a Bf 109 and a Focke-Wulf Fw 190, earning him the Distinguished Flying Cross. A day later Beeson claimed his tenth enemy aircraft.  By February 1944, the Eighth Air Force launched a series of large-scale raids to prompt the Luftwaffe into a battle of attrition and create air superiority over Europe. Operation Pointblank was aimed at the destruction of the Luftwaffe through air combat, the strafing of German airfields, and the bombing of aircraft factories.

The big raids were dubbed "Big Week." The 4th FG P-47s were equipped with two drop tanks that doubled their combat range. Blakeslee was able to get top priority for the new P-51 Mustangs, promising "I'll have them operational in 24 hours." When the group flew its first missions on February 25, the pilots had less than one hour and ten minutes' flight time in the new fighter. During the week, Beeson was awarded an oak leaf cluster to his Distinguished Flying Cross and promoted to captain. With 80 combat missions completed he was made commanding officer of B Flight at the age of 22.

On February 28, Beeson got his new P-51B. He and crew chief Willard Wahl named the aircraft simply "Bee." In his first mission across the English Channel he strafed a Junkers Ju 88 on the ground. On March 23, Beeson downed two more Bf 109s, making him the Army Air Forces' most successful ace. It was Beeson's 93rd combat mission and he had 17 claims.

He got two more kills, but on April 5 he was brought down by German fire from the ground.  He was captured and interrogated by the famous Hanns Scharff. In a prisoner-of-war camp Beeson passed the time boxing, reading, and studying. The camp was liberated by Soviet forces on April 29, 1945. It took Beeson nearly a month to make it back to Debden. While a prisoner of war, Beeson had been promoted to major and had received the Distinguished Service Cross, the Silver Star, the Distinguished Flying Cross with five oak leaf clusters, and the Air Medal, most of which were presented to his parents at Gowen Field.

Post war
He returned to Boise in June 1945 and made every effort to get reassigned to the Pacific theatre, but the Pacific War soon ended. Beeson was reassigned to Sarasota, Florida, where he met his future wife, Tracy Waters. They married in Baltimore in January 1946. Soon afterward Beeson became violently ill. Doctors diagnosed a brain tumor and Beeson was flown to Walter Reed Hospital in Washington, D.C. for an operation. He died before the operation could be performed. He was just 25 years old. He is buried at Arlington National Cemetery.

In November 1993, the Duane W. Beeson Terminal Building was named in his honor.

Military decorations

Beeson's awards include:

References

Further reading
 Air Force Magazine December 1944, "Portrait of a Crew Chief, Sgt. Samuel W. Taylor"
 Fry, Garry; The Duane Beeson Story, American Aviation Historical Society, Winter, 1978
 Duane Beeson Gun Camera Films

External links
 4th Fighter Group Association World War II
 Duane Beeson at acesofww2.com

1921 births
1947 deaths
American World War II flying aces
Aviators from Idaho
Burials at Arlington National Cemetery
Deaths from brain cancer in Washington, D.C.
Recipients of the Air Medal
Recipients of the Distinguished Flying Cross (United States)
Recipients of the Distinguished Service Cross (United States)
Recipients of the Silver Star
United States Army Air Forces officers
United States Army Air Forces pilots of World War II
Recipients of the Croix de guerre (Belgium)
American Royal Air Force pilots of World War II
American prisoners of war in World War II
World War II prisoners of war held by Germany